Robbie Robinson (born February 2, 1959 in New York City, New York) is a professional basketball referee who officiated in the National Basketball Association (NBA) for 3 seasons beginning in the 2004–05 NBA season.  He wore jersey number 53.

He was a member of the officiating crew during the Knicks–Nuggets brawl on December 16, 2006.

Robinson was fired from the NBA after the 2006–07 season for poor performance following a three–year trial run.

References

External links
 http://basketball.pinnaclesports.com/NBA/referees/referee.aspx?RefId=110

Sportspeople from New York City
Living people
National Basketball Association referees
1959 births